Stenolicmus is a genus of pencil catfishes native to South America.

Species
There are currently two recognized species in this genus:
 Stenolicmus ix Wosiacki, Montag and Coutinho, 2011
 Stenolicmus sarmientoi de Pinna & Starnes, 1990

References

Trichomycteridae
Fish of South America
Freshwater fish genera
Catfish genera